Ranvik Bay is an open bay 15 nautical miles (28 km) wide, lying southward of Rauer Islands in the southeast part of Prydz Bay. Discovered and charted in February 1935 by a Norwegian expedition led by Captain Klarius Mikkelsen in the Thorshavn. Named after the estate of Lars Christensen, sponsor of the expedition, situated at the head of Ranvik, a bay in Norway.

Bays of Princess Elizabeth Land
Ingrid Christensen Coast